Valeriy Bohdanovych Litanyuk (born 2 April 1994) is a Ukrainian racewalker. In 2019, he competed in the men's 50 kilometres walk at the 2019 World Athletics Championships held in Doha, Qatar. He finished in 25th place.

In 2017, he competed in the men's 20 kilometres walk at the 2017 Summer Universiade held in Taipei, Taiwan. He finished in 10th place. In 2018, he competed in the men's 50 kilometres walk at the 2018 European Athletics Championships held in Berlin, Germany. He finished in 18th place.

References

External links 
 

Living people
1994 births
Place of birth missing (living people)
Ukrainian male racewalkers
World Athletics Championships athletes for Ukraine
Competitors at the 2017 Summer Universiade
Athletes (track and field) at the 2020 Summer Olympics
Olympic athletes of Ukraine